Alfred Watkins (27 January 1855 – 15 April 1935) was an English author, self-taught amateur archaeologist, antiquarian and businessman who, while standing on a hillside in Herefordshire, England, in 1921 experienced a revelation. He noticed on the British landscape an apparent arrangement of straight lines positioned along ancient features. For these he subsequently coined the term "ley", now usually referred to as ley line, because the line passed through places whose names contained the syllable "ley".

Life
Watkins was born in Hereford to an affluent family which had moved to the town in 1820 to establish several businesses including a flour-mill, a hotel and brewery. Watkins travelled across Herefordshire as an 'out-rider' representing the family businesses and so got to know the area intimately.

Watkins was also a respected photographer. He made some cameras himself and manufactured an exposure meter called the Watkins Bee Meter due to its small size and efficiency. An example is in the Museum Resource & Learning Centre in Hereford. Frank Hurley used Bee Meters while he was expedition photographer on the Australian explorer Douglas Mawson's Australasian Antarctic Expedition, which departed in 1911 and returned in 1914. Hurley also used Bee Meters on Sir Ernest Shackleton's Imperial Trans-Antarctic Expedition which set out in 1914. The meters sank with the ship Endurance. Another accompanied Herbert Ponting and Robert Falcon Scott to the South Pole in 1910.

Watkins was active in the Photographic Convention of the United Kingdom and served as its president when it was held in Hereford in 1907. In 1910 he was awarded the Progress Medal of the Royal Photographic Society (RPS). Instituted in 1878, the medal honours any invention, research, publication or other contribution resulting in an important advance in the scientific or technological development of photography or imaging in the widest sense. It also carries with it Honorary Fellowship of the society. Over 3,000 photographs, taken from Alfred's original glass negative plates are held by Hereford Library.

In photography, Watkins began with a primitive pinhole camera made from a cigar box. He devised an "exposure meter" after exploring the mathematical relations of light, lens size and exposure period. He published findings in the April 1890 edition of the British Journal of Photography and patented his exposure meter. The Watkins Meter Company was active for over 40 years and exported all over the world. The device contributed much to photography's emergence as a mass-market art form. His Watkins Manual of Exposure and Development (1900), ran to eleven editions.

On 30 June 1921, Watkins visited Blackwardine in Herefordshire and had the idea that there was a system of straight lines crossing the landscape dating from Neolithic times. He presented his ideas at a meeting of the Woolhope Naturalists' Field Club of Hereford in September 1921, and published his first books Early British Trackways in 1922 and The Old Straight Track in 1925. Thereafter he spent a major part of his life developing his theory. He published a further book on leys and participated in the Old Straight Track Club from 1927 to 1935. (Its papers are also in the Hereford City Museum.)

Watkins was a member of the Society for the Protection of Ancient Buildings, an authority on beekeeping and a fellow of the Royal Photographic Society. He was also involved in the preservation of Pembridge Market Hall in Herefordshire.

Legacy

Archaeologists in general do not accept Watkins' ideas on leys. At first they regarded the ancient Britons as too primitive to have devised such an arrangement, but this is no longer the argument used against the existence of leys. More crucially, there are so many ancient features that finding some in approximate alignment is highly likely. Watkins was sensitive to such arguments and argued for caution.

Watkins' work resurfaced in popularised form from the 1960s following the publication of John Michell's book The View over Atlantis in 1969. Michell merged Watkins' ideas with mystical concepts not present in Watkins' own work. In 2004, John Bruno Hare of the Internet Sacred Texts Archive (ISTA) wrote:

In 2002 Watkins had a beer named after him, "Watkins' Triumph", brewed by Wye Valley Brewery Ltd.

Books by Alfred Watkins

Alfred Watkins's Herefordshire in his own Words and Photographs, Logaston Press, 14 November 2012. A previously unpublished manuscript, written in 1931

References

Biographies

Alfred Watkins, A Herefordshire Man by Ron Shoesmith Logaston Press, 1990
Biographical introduction to Alfred Watkins' Herefordshire in his own words and photographs by Ron & Jennifer Shoesmith; Logaston Press; November 2012
Herefordshire Then & Now: A photographic journey with Alfred Watkins by Jim Wood – 20 April 2015 

1855 births
1935 deaths
Amateur archaeologists
English beekeepers
People from Hereford
Photographers from Herefordshire
Ley lines
Pseudoarchaeologists